John Donaldson was born at Edinburgh in 1737, and distinguished himself as a miniature painter, both in enamel and water-colours. In the year 1764, and again in 1768, he obtained the premium given by the Society of Arts for the best picture in enamel. He occasionally amused himself with the point, and etched several plates of beggars, after Rembrandt, which possess considerable merit. He died in London in 1801.

References

 

18th-century Scottish painters
Scottish male painters
1737 births
1801 deaths
Artists from Edinburgh
Portrait miniaturists